Donia El-Ibdaa School is a school in Tripoli, Libya which educates children ages 4–19. It is unusual in having a (primary-only) "British" section in which all lessons are taught in the English language. The school was established in 1992 but moved to larger, purpose-built premises in 2003.

External links 
Donia El-Ibdaa School

Educational institutions established in 1992
Elementary and primary schools in Libya
1992 establishments in Libya
High schools and secondary schools in Libya